Han Ik-su (October 15, 1912 – September 5, 1978) was North Korean politician and militarist, guerrilla fighter, ambassador to China, member of the Politburo of the Central Committee of the Workers’ Party of Korea, and the Central Committee Auditing Committee Chairman.

Biography
Han Ik-su was born into a poor peasant family on October 15, 1912 in Longjing, Jilin, China. In 1945, Japan surrendered and the end of World War II, Han Ik-su continued to serve the North Korean government, and later became the company commander. Later, he was appointed as the principal of Kang Kon Military Academy. Before the Korean War broke out, he had been promoted to general. In 1961, he became a member of the Party Central Committee. From 1962 to 64, he was sent to Beijing as an ambassador to China, and was elected as a member of the Supreme People's Assembly in the same period. In 1968, he was promoted to director of the General Political Bureau of the Korean People's Army. The following year, he was elected as an alternate member of the Political Bureau.

In 1970, Han Ik-su became a member of the Political Committee following the 5th Congress of the Workers' Party of Korea. Two years later, he was awarded Kim Il Sung Order. In 1977, he was appointed chairman of the review committee of the Party Central Committee. After dying the following year, the Pyongyang government buried him in the Revolutionary Martyrs' Cemetery in recognition of his credit and cast a bust of him.

Works

References

1912 births
1978 deaths
Workers' Party of Korea politicians
North Korean diplomats
Members of the Supreme People's Assembly
People from Yanbian